Huara is a Chilean town and commune in Tamarugal Province, Tarapacá Region. The village is crossed by the Pan-American Highway and is the crossing point for the road that goes to Oruro in Bolivia. This road also serves as access to the Atacama Giant site and the  Volcán Isluga National Park.

The commune also comprises the Pisagua and Tarapacá hamlets.

Huara was badly damaged during an earthquake in 2005.

Demographics
According to the 2002 census of the National Statistics Institute Huara had 2,599 inhabitants (1,499 men and 1,100 women), making it an entirely rural area. The population grew by 1.8% (627 persons) between the 1992 and 2002 censuses.

Administration
As a commune, Huara is a third-level administrative division of Chile administered by a municipal council, headed by an alcalde who is directly elected every four years.

Within the electoral divisions of Chile, Huara is represented in the Chamber of Deputies by Mrs. Marta Isasi (Ind.) and Mr. Hugo Gutiérrez (PC) as part of the 2nd electoral district, which includes the entire Tarapacá Region. The commune is represented in the Senate by José Miguel Insulza (PS, 2018–2026) and José Durana (UDI, 2018–2026) as part of the 1st senatorial constituency (Arica and Parinacota Region and Tarapacá Region).

References

External links
 Claudio Aguirre Munizaga y Alberto Díaz Araya, El espejismo de los lugares. La construcción del espacio en el desierto tarapaqueño. Huara, siglos XIX-XX, Revista de geografía Norte Grande versión On-line ISSN 0718-3402

Communes of Chile
Populated places established in 1885
Populated places in El Tamarugal Province